Monimosocia is a genus of moths belonging to the family Tortricidae.

Species
Monimosocia parvisignis (Meyrick, 1931)

See also
List of Tortricidae genera

References

  1990: Ann. Zool. 43: 399

External links
tortricidae.com

Euliini
Tortricidae genera